John Menton (born 2 May 1970) is an Irish athlete. He competed in the men's discus throw at the 2000 Summer Olympics.

References

External links
 

1970 births
Living people
Athletes (track and field) at the 2000 Summer Olympics
Irish male discus throwers
Olympic athletes of Ireland
Place of birth missing (living people)